Víznar is a municipality located in the province of Granada, Spain, only a few miles from the city of Granada itself. According to the 2005 census (INE), the town has a population of 789 inhabitants.

Site of the exquisite neo-classical Summer palace of an 18th-century archbishop of Granada, Don José Manuel Moscoso y Peralta, (1723–1811), an important figure in the history of Peru, the near-vicinity of Víznar was the place of execution, in 1936, of the noted Spanish poet, Federico García Lorca, at the beginning of the Spanish Civil War.

References

Municipalities in the Province of Granada